Al-Hamadaniah Tennis Complex is a tennis complex in Aleppo, Syria, featuring an indoor tennis court with a seating capacity of 800 spectators and an outdoor tennis court with a seating capacity of 598 spectators along with 4 other outdoor training courts. The complex was opened in 2008, as part of the al-Hamadaniah Sports City.

The 1st major tournament in the complex took place in the outdoor courts between 15 and 19 April 2009, when Aleppo hosted the 2009 Davis Cup Asia/Oceania Zone Group III matches, with the participation of the 8 following teams:

References

Sports venues completed in 2008
Sports venues in Aleppo
2008 establishments in Syria